Air Commodore Richard John Atkinson,  (born c. 1964), is a senior Royal Air Force officer and former Air Officer Scotland.

RAF career
Atkinson joined the Royal Air Force in 1982. He was appointed Officer Commanding No. 25 (Fighter) Squadron at RAF Leeming in 2003, Deputy Director, Strategic Planning in the Ministry of Defence in 2005 and was then deployed as Deputy Director, Air Control Element, Headquarters International Security Assistance Force, Kabul in 2008. He became Officer Commanding No 125 Expeditionary Air Wing as well as Air Officer Scotland and Station Commander RAF Leuchars in 2009 and, in that role, led the transformation of RAF Leuchars from being a Tornado base into a Typhoon base before retiring in 2011.

Atkinson was appointed Commander of the Order of the British Empire (CBE) in the 2012 New Year Honours.

After retiring from the RAF, he became Director of Marketing And Communication at the Chartered Institute of Logistics and Transport.

References

|-

|-

|-

Commanders of the Order of the British Empire
Royal Air Force air commodores
Royal Air Force personnel of the War in Afghanistan (2001–2021)
Living people
1960s births
Year of birth uncertain